Houston Medical is an American documentary series that aired from June 18, 2002 to July 23, 2002.

Premise
The lives of staffers and patients at Memorial Hermann–Texas Medical Center in Houston, Texas are followed over the course of a year.

Cast

Episodes

References

External links
IMDb

2002 American television series debuts
2002 American television series endings
American Broadcasting Company original programming
2000s American documentary television series
2000s American medical television series
English-language television shows
Television shows set in Houston